The Linux kernel mailing list (LKML) is the main electronic mailing list for Linux kernel development, where the majority of the announcements, discussions, debates, and flame wars over the kernel take place. Many other mailing lists exist to discuss the different subsystems and ports of the Linux kernel, but LKML is the principal communication channel among Linux kernel developers. It is a very high-volume list, usually receiving about 1,000 messages each day, most of which are kernel code patches.

Linux utilizes a workflow governed by LKML, which is the "bazaar" where kernel development takes place. In his book Linux Kernel Development, Robert Love notes:

The LKML functions as the central place where Linux developers around the world share patches, argue about implementation details, and discuss other issues. The official releases of the Linux kernel are indicated by an email to LKML. New features are discussed and most code is posted to the list before any action is taken. It is also the official place for reporting bugs in the Linux kernel, in case one cannot find the maintainer to whom the bug should be reported. Author Michelle Delio suggests that it was on LKML that Tux, the official Linux mascot, was suggested and refined, although the accuracy of her reporting in other stories has been disputed. Many companies associated with Linux kernel make announcements and proposals on LKML; for example, Novell, Intel, VMware, and IBM.

The list subscribers include all the Linux kernel maintainers as well as other known figures in Linux circles, such as Jeff V. Merkey and Eric S. Raymond. A 2000 study found that 14,535 people, from at least 30 countries, sent at least one email to LKML between 1995 and 2000 to participate in the discussion of Linux development.

Authors of books such as The Linux Kernel Development As A Model of Open Source Knowledge Creation and Motivation of Software Developers in Open Source Projects, and Recovering Device Drivers have made use of LKML for their research studies and surveys.

Media coverage 
LWN.net website frequently cover discussion on the lkml and the newsletter Kernel Traffic covered the activities of the Linux-kernel mailing list until November 2005. Many internet websites include archives of the mailing list, such as lore.kernel.org/lkml, lkml.org, mail-archive.com and marc.info.

Linus Torvalds on LKML 
Linus Torvalds is known for angrily disagreeing with other developers on the LKML. Calling himself a "really unpleasant person", he later explained "I'd like to be a nice person and curse less and encourage people to grow rather than telling them they are idiots. I'm sorryI tried, it's just not in me."

His attitude, which Torvalds considers necessary for making his point clear, has drawn opposition from Intel programmer Sage Sharp and systemd developer Lennart Poettering, among others. In 2018 Torvalds took a break from kernel development to work on improving his behavior and instituted a code of conduct.

See also 
 kernel.org home site for kernel source code distribution
 LWN.net among other things, provides a weekly LKML news digest
 KernelTrap former news website
 ZMailer a mail transfer agent used by vger.kernel.org

References

External links 
 Subscribe to the Linux Kernel Mailing List
 LKML archive at Indiana University
 LKML archive at MARC (archive)
 Majordomo lists at vger.kernel.org – Other Linux kernel related lists
 A semi-daily LKML Summary Podcast
 Official FAQ of the Linux Kernel Mailing List (outdated)
 The Linux Kernel Hub
 Kernel Traffic website

Linux kernel
Electronic mailing lists